James Phillip Frank Tartaglia (born 29 October 1973) is a British philosopher who defends metaphysical idealism and existential nihilism, as well as a jazz saxophonist whose "jazz-philosophy fusion" combines jazz music with philosophical ideas.

Biography 
Tartaglia was born in Portsmouth, England, and grew up in Hereford, where he started playing alto saxophone at age 11 after hearing Cannonball Adderley's recording of "Another Kind of Soul".  He was winner in the soloist category of the Daily Telegraph Young Jazz Competition in 1991 and successfully auditioned in Frankfurt for a scholarship to Berklee College of Music, Boston, where he studied from 1992-3; his saxophone teacher was George Garzone.  He began an economics degree at University College London in 1993, but soon switched to philosophy. He obtained a BA (1996), M.Phil. (1998) and Ph.D. (2001) in philosophy from UCL, where he studied with Tim Crane and J.J. Valberg.  He was Visiting Lecturer at the University of Birmingham from 2001-2 and then was appointed Lecturer in Philosophy at Keele University in 2002, where he stayed to become Professor of Metaphysical Philosophy in 2017; his inaugural lecture was a jazz-philosophy fusion performance entitled, “I’m Gonna Tell You the Meaning of Life”.  He is an Associate Editor at the journal Human Affairs.

Views 
Tartaglia argues that nihilism is an evaluatively neutral fact about reality; nihilism is not a negative state of affairs, as it is standardly assumed to be, nor a positive state of affairs, as per the 'Sunny Nihilism' most notably defended by Wendy Syfret.  When Tartaglia was questioned about his nihilism by Rowan Williams on BBC Radio 4's Moral Maze, Williams' line of questioning concerned the lack of moral guidance that neutral nihilism offers. In response to a similar line of questioning from Rabbi Adam Jacobs, Tartaglia said that the problem with using the meaning of life as a basis for moral judgements is that, "nobody's ever been able to agree on what it is." Tartaglia argues for metaphysical idealism on the grounds of its ability to explain why there is anything at all; its universality within world culture; and its ability to preserve our common sense intuitions.

Books

Authored books 
•	Inner Space Philosophy (Winchester, UK: Iff Books, forthcoming 2023)

•	(with Tracy Llanera) A Defence of Nihilism (London: Routledge 2021)

•	Gods and Titans (London: Bloomsbury 2020)

•	Philosophy in a Meaningless Life (London: Bloomsbury 2016)

•	Rorty and the Mirror of Nature (London: Routledge 2007)

Edited books 
•	(with Stephen Leach) The Meaning of Life and the Great Philosophers (London: Routledge 2018)

•	Nihilism and the Meaning of Life: A Philosophical Dialogue with James Tartaglia , edited by Masahiro Morioka (Saitama, Japan: University of Waseda 2017)

•	(with Stephen Leach) Consciousness and the Great Philosophers (London: Routledge 2016)

•	(with Stephen Leach) Richard Rorty’s Mind, Language, and Metaphilosophy: Early Philosophical Papers (Cambridge: Cambridge University Press 2014)

•	Richard Rorty: Critical Assessments of Leading Philosophers, 4 volumes (London: Routledge 2009)

Discography 
•	Look For Work, 2021 – with Steve Tromans (piano)

•	Jazz-Philosophy Fusion, 2016  – with Jessica Radcliffe (vocals), Sonja Morgenstern (vocals), Steve Tromans (piano), David Hilton (bass), Tymoteusz Jozwiak (drums), Gareth Fowler (guitar)

•	Kooky Steps, 2014 – with Mark Huggett (drums), Jennifer Maidman (bass), Annie Whitehead (trombone), Thomas Seminar Ford (guitar), Sonja Morgenstern (vocals), Dagmar Wilhelm (vocals)

•	Dark Metaphysic, 2008 – with Mark Huggett (drums), Jennifer Maidman (bass), Annie Whitehead (trombone), Ben Thomas (trumpet), Matt Ratcliffe (keyboard) 

•	A Free Jazz Treatise Concerning Human Affairs, 2003 - with Mark Huggett (drums), Nick Haward (bass), Sonja Morgenstern (vocals), Lizzi Wood (vocals)

References

External links 
James Tartaglia’s website
Jazz-Philosophy Fusion website

1973 births
Living people
English philosophers
English jazz saxophonists
Academics of the University of Birmingham
Academics of Keele University
Alumni of University College London
Berklee College of Music alumni